Julien Courbet (born 7 February 1965) is a French journalist, television presenter and producer.

Early life and education 
Julien Courbet was born Frédéric René Courbet in Eysines, a town located in the suburb of Bordeaux, department of Gironde. He studied and graduated at the IUT Techniques de commercialisation in University Bordeaux IV.

Radio career 
Julien Courbet began his career as a radio presenter on various radios in Bordeaux (Radio Angora, NRJ, Fun Radio, Wit FM). From 1986 to 1991, he became a presenter on France 3 Aquitaine. He officiated on Wit FM hosting the program Que fait la police ? in the morning, on Sud Radio where he met Hervé Pouchol, who will later become his mediator for La guerre des voisins, and then on NRJ from 1992 to 1994 with the program N'importe quoi.

Television career

Career on TF1 
He met Gérard Louvin in 1993 who engaged him on TF1. After being a columnist on the program Sacrée Soirée, Julien Courbet started presenting programs produced by Gérard Louvin and started with Sans aucun doute. From 1994 to 2008, he officiated on the channel where he hosted a number of programs (Code de la route...) and produced some of them (Le Grand Frère, Le Détective...). He rose to fame by becoming the presenter specialized in romance scams especially with Les Sept Péchés capitaux and also Sans aucun doute in which he made very good audience. He then created in 2004 the program Stop arnaques.

In 2005, he created his new production company La Concepteria after having sold the previous one Quai Sud Télévisions at TF1, who owned the programs Sans aucun doute and Confessions Intimes. In March 2007, he created a website which is a guide for the consumers, with articles treating about legal terms, explaining the rights, the obligations and the solutions to problems that can have the customers.

Career on France 2 
In September 2008, he joined France 2 to present until February 2009 the program Service Maximum on prime time. His departure from TF1 was justified by the fact that the channel refused to broadcast a daily program before the evening. France 2 accepted Julien Courbet for the concept after his appointment with Patrick de Carolis. However, despite his departure of France 2, he continued to produce for TF1 the program Le Grand Frère. He produced in 2008 on channel Direct 8 the program Je suis timide mais j'me soigne.

His arrival on France 2 was not appreciated by everybody, especially by Nicolas Sarkozy and the Minister of Culture. His new program was also not well received by the audience. In February 2009, the program was not broadcast anymore, but Julien Courbet stayed on France Télévisions.

France Télévisions 
After the failure of Service Maximum, Julien Courbet continued presenting his program of defence for the consumers on RTL but managed to present entertainment and game shows on television. In May 2009, he commented with Cyril Hanouna the 54th Eurovision Song Contest directly from Moscow, won by Alexander Rybak for Norway and where French singer Patricia Kaas was ranked number eight for France. In June 2009, he presented Le Grand défi des animateurs.

In summer 2009, he hosts the game show Le 4e duel from Monday to Friday in the evening. He later presents the game show En toutes lettres on France 2, first alone and then with Pierre Bellemare. In December 2009, he presented the program Soyons sport ! on France 2 and France 3 directly from Annecy for the Téléthon with Amel Bent and Sophie Davant. In summer 2010, he hosted again the game show Le 4e duel for a new season, but this time broadcast on weekends.

In the meantime, he continues producing programs especially for TF1 such as Tous ensemble since 2009, Abus de confiance since July 2010, and Voisins, vont-ils se mettre d'accord since October 2010, featuring former tennis player Henri Leconte, become a specialist in communications. In September 2010, he continued hosting the game shows En toutes lettres and Le 4e duel. In December 2010, he presented another serie of the program Le Grand défi des animateurs.

In June 2011, he presented the program Code de la route : À vous de jouer, and in September 2011, the program Seriez-vous un bon expert ? on France 2. In May 2012, he presented the program La grande révision on the same channel, and in June, another season of the game show Le 4e duel.

Personal life 
Julien Courbet married Catherine Courbet in July 1998. They have two children, daughter Lola (born 20 April 2000) and son Gabin (born 10 December 2001).

Television programs

TF1 (1994–2008) 
 Pourquoi pas vous ? (1994)
 Vacances à Saint-Tropez (1994) 
 Sans aucun doute (1994–2008)
 Si on chantait (1995–96) 
 Parlez-moi d'amour (1995) 
 Les années pub (1996)
 Les enfants de la guerre (1996)
 Quel cirque ! (1997)
 Intervilles with Jean-Pierre Foucault (1998)
 Les Sept Péchés capitaux (1999–2006)
 Succès (1999)
 Ça peut vous arriver (2001–02)
 Le Coach (2002)
 Le Champion de la télé (2004)
 La Grande Soirée Anti-Arnaque (2005–07)
 La Grande Soirée du sommeil (2005)
 Les 30 arnaques de stars les plus incroyables (2006)
 Les voisins vont-ils se mettre d'accord ? (2006)
 Les maîtres de l'imposture (2007)
 Les 40 arnaques les plus incroyables (2007)
 Code de la route, repassez-le en direct (2008)
 Le Détective (2008)
 Les Rois du Système D (2008)

France 2 (2008–13) 
 Service Maximum (2008–09)
 Le Téléthon (2008–10)
 Le grand défi des animateurs (2009–10)
 Le 4e duel (2009–12)
 En toutes lettres (2009–11)
 Une star peut en bluffer une autre (2010)
 Votre plus belle soirée (2011)
 Code de la route : À vous de jouer (2011)
 Seriez-vous un bon expert ? (2011–13)
 La grande révision (2012)

TMC (2013–14) 
 Sans aucun doute

D8 - C8 (2014–2018) 
 Le Maillon Faible (2014-2015, revival of The Weakest Link)
 À prendre ou à laisser (2014-2015)
 Touche pas à mon poste ! (2014-2018) : columnist and substitute host
 Le Grand Match (2015)
Les Rois du barbecue (September 2015)
 Faut pas abuser (2016-2017)
 Still Standing : Qui passera à la trappe ? (summer 2016)
 Les Sept Péchés capitaux (2016-2017) 
 Abus de confiance (2017) 
 La Télé même l'été ! et La Télé même l'été ! Le jeu ! (summer 2017)
 C'est que de la télé !  (September 2017 - June 2018)
 Héritage de Johnny : la guerre des clans (March 2018)
Nordahl Lelandais, dans la tête du prédateur (June 2018)

Producer 
 Confessions Intimes (since 2001) on TF1
 Voisins vont-ils se mettre d'accord ? (2006) on TF1
 Le Grand Frère (2006–12) on TF1
 Le Monde à l'Envers (2007–08) presented by Jean-Pierre Pernaut on TF1
 Au cœur du couple (2008) on TF1
 Tous ensemble (since 2009) on TF1
 Abus de confiance (2010) on TF1
 Voisins vont-ils se mettre d'accord ? (since 2010) with Henri Leconte on TF1
 Le Resto, l'espoir d'une nouvelle vie since 2011 on TF1
 Le Jour où tout a basculé (since 2011) on France 2
 Le Jour où tout à basculé à l'audience (since 2012) on France 2
 En toutes lettres ! (2009–11)
 Seriez-vous un bon expert ? (2011–13)

Bibliography 
Ôtez-moi d'un doute (1998), Éditions 1
Stop aux Arnaques - Le Guide Spécial Logement (2004), Michel Lafon
Stop aux Arnaques - Le Guide (2004), Michel Lafon
Stop aux arnaques le guide - Spécial patrimoine (2005), Michel Lafon
Stop aux arnaques : le guide spécial vacances (2006), Michel Lafon
Stop aux arnaques, le guide, spécial santé (2007), Michel Lafon
Le guide du bon voisinage à la ville et à la campagne (2007), Flammarion
Le Guide du consommer moins cher (2009), Solar

References

External links 

Official blog of Julien Courbet 

1965 births
Living people
French journalists
French television presenters
Mass media people from Bordeaux
French male non-fiction writers